Slinfah is a Syrian town-resort, founded in 1929, administratively belonging to Al-Haffah District within the Latakia Governorate. It is located at an average height of 1130 metres above sea level on the An-Nusayriyah Mountains, 50 km east of Latakia city. According to the 2004 official census, the town's population is 1,847, reaching up to 19,518 inhabitants with the 25 surrounding villages in the Slinfah subdistrict (nahiyah).

With its mild summer temperature, Slinfah is a popular destination for Syrians. The town is characterised with severe cold temperature and heavy snow in winter.

The historical Citadel of Salah Ed-Din is only 13 km west of Slinfah.

Geography

The town is located 50 km east of Latakia, and is located in the heart of the Coastal Mountains of Syria, with the town reaching an elevation of 1130 meters. Slinfah's highest point is the peak of the Prophet Yunis which has a height of 1300 metres above sea level. The nearby Shooh mountains are covered with 500 hectares of fir trees.

Climate

In Slinfah, the climate is warm and temperate. In winter there is much more rainfall in Slinfah than in summer. According to Köppen and Geiger climate is classified as Csb. About  of precipitation falls annually.

Gallery

References

External links

Populated places in al-Haffah District
Towns in Syria
Alawite communities in Syria